Alexandrovka is a rural locality in Vyshnederevensky Selsoviet Rural Settlement, Lgovsky District, Kursk Oblast, Russia. Population:

Geography 
The village is located on the Bobrik River (a left tributary of the Reut River in the Seym basin), 36 km from the Russia–Ukraine border, 60 km south-west of Kursk, 20 km south-east of the district center – the town Lgov, 10 km from the selsoviet center – Vyshniye Derevenki.

 Climate
Alexandrovka has a warm-summer humid continental climate (Dfb in the Köppen climate classification).

Transport 

The rural locality is situated 67 km from Kursk Vostochny Airport, 125 km from Belgorod International Airport and 267 km from Voronezh Peter the Great Airport.

References

Notes

Sources

Rural localities in Lgovsky District